Hyacinthoides × massartiana is a hybrid species produced by crosses between the common bluebell, H. non-scripta and the Spanish bluebell, H. hispanica. H. × massartiana fills a spectrum of variation which connects the two parental species.

Distribution 
Hyacinthoides × massartiana has become widespread across Britain and Belgium, both of which have large populations of H. non-scripta. It is often found on the edges of woodland and roadsides, particularly in urban areas, suggesting that it has spread from gardens planted with H. hispanica. There is great concern over the effect that the hybrid may have on native H. non-scripta populations, diluting the characteristics of the native species and out-competing it due to H. hispanica's robust fertility and the effects of climate change.

Taxonomic history
Hybrids between H. non-scripta and H. hispanica were first given a specific name in 1997, when the Belgian botanist D. Geerinck described them as H. × massartiana, honouring the botanist Jean Massart. The type locality is Watermael-Boitsfort, near Brussels, Belgium; the holotype is held in Brussels, with an isotype in Liège. The same taxon had already been given the name "Hyacinthoides × variabilis" by P. D. Sell in 1996 in the Flora of Great Britain and Ireland, but without a valid Latin diagnosis.

References

External links

massartiana
Interspecific plant hybrids
Plants described in 1997